Donald (Don) James Smith (March 23, 1924 – July 16, 2013) was a Canadian business leader, entrepreneur, and philanthropist. He is the former president and CEO of EllisDon Corporation and is widely recognized for co-founding the construction giant and the landmark projects it was responsible for completing. EllisDon now has over 2500 employees, bringing in over $3.5 billion in revenues annually.

Early life 
Donald "Bus" Smith was born on March 23, 1924, in Provost, Alberta, to Donald Bennett Smith and Florence Marie Smith. Don had an older brother, David Ellis Smith, and a younger sister, Muriel.

In 1929, when the stock market crashed, Donald Bennett Smith, a bank manager, lost everything. In 1930, during the Great Depression, when Don was six years old, his father suddenly died leaving Florence and the children with nothing at all. With no prospects in Provost and no way of supporting her family, Florence and her children were forced to move to Toronto, Ontario, Canada. Upon moving to North Toronto, Florence found a home and a job as a Sales Clerk at Eaton's department store. Soon after, Smith's cousin George Ellis moved in with the family when his own father died.

With his mother always working and no father, Smith decided he needed to start making his own way. At the age of 10, Smith was given a toy movie projector from his mother. He proved himself a natural entrepreneur when he began using it to host Charlie Chaplin movie screenings in his basement for the neighbourhood kids, charging five-cents a head per showing.  Smith later became a paper boy for the Toronto Star with his own route where he was successful. A combination of the Toronto Star paper route and other part-time jobs taught Smith the value of hard work.

As a young adult, Smith aspired to be an aeronautical engineer and so he enrolled into the Engineering program at the University of Toronto. Due to a condition from birth, Smith suffered from a tremor in his hands which caused him to have bad writing. Smith's professors returned ungraded tests because they could not read his writing and as a result, he was forced to drop out of school after his first year of university. Shortly after, he joined Foundation Company, one of the biggest construction firms in Canada at the time where he was made Superintendent by the age of 25.

In January, 1949, Smith married his wife, Elizabeth Joan McDonald. The newlywed couple moved to London, Ontario where they had their first child, Catherine, the same year in November. Catherine was their first of seven children followed by Robert, Lynne, Geoff, Michael, Donald, and David. Joan was a University of Toronto graduate with a degree in Philosophy. She began her career with charitable service and eventually moved on to municipal and provincial politics.

Career 
At age 27, Smith quit his job at Foundation Company in pursuit of his own company. On April Fools' Day, 1951, Smith and his brother David launched EllisDon. The name of the company combined Don's first name and David's middle name, Ellis. Their first project was a small home renovation job which was funded by their mother who was also their bookkeeper. On the first day of business EllisDon also received a contract for a small three-room schoolhouse, Northdale Public School in London, Ontario. Shortly after its inception, David left EllisDon and relocated to Calgary, Ontario.

From the beginning, Smith built EllisDon into an industry leader with rapid growth. It began with schools and universities and eventually moved into other sectors like healthcare and office buildings, among other projects. Between 1956 and 1968, EllisDon made critical business investments, which included computerizing its accounting and cost control systems, and operating a purchased tower crane – the first construction company in Canada to do both. In 1971, EllisDon cemented safety as a top priority by becoming one of the first construction companies to launch a Corporate Safety Strategy to improve overall job site safety. Between 1974 and 1976, EllisDon focused on expanding, and established operations in Edmonton, Alberta and in Saudi Arabia. In 1978, and in the next three years that followed, EllisDon took on local projects that included the Grand Theatre in London, Ontario; Commonwealth Stadium in Edmonton, Alberta; a Bank of Canada in Ottawa, Ontario; and Peel Regional Police Headquarters and 22 Division in Brampton, Ontario– to name a few.

By 1982 EllisDon was awarded a Construction Management Contract for the Metro Toronto Convention Centre project. It was after this that Smith knew EllisDon had enough experience to take on a project that was of a much larger scale. In 1986 Smith took a big risk and bet the entire company to bid on the Rogers Centre, formerly known as Skydome. Although the company faced many obstacles over the course of the project, it deemed very successful. The project was completed in three short years and on June 3, 1989, the Rogers Center officially opened its doors, making it the world's first retractable rooftop stadium. This project was Smith's pride and joy and represented the height of his career.

Just as fast as EllisDon was evolving, Smith built a reputation for himself as well. He was known as a hard-driven boss with high expectations. Although he was demanding, Smith took a big interest in their personal welfare too. He was highly involved in all facets of the company while maintaining close relationships with all of his employees. He frequently visited job sites to find out information about the projects and teams, but also to stay updated with what is going on in his employees' personal lives. Smith knew the name of every employee, their spouse and their children. Regardless of their position, Smith had a talent for treating everyone equally.

Under Smith's leadership, EllisDon has evolved into one of Canada's biggest construction names and has been responsible for many notable projects including the University of Western Ontario, the Metro Hall complex, and the Princess of Wales Theatre.

In 1996, Smith retired. His son Geoff Smith, took over EllisDon as president and CEO.

Philanthropy 
Smith was a strong advocate of giving back to the community and took pride in his social activity and philanthropy. Having grown up without a lot of money, he understood the challenges and fully committed himself to helping others in every way he could. Over his life, Smith raised millions of dollars toward charitable causes and positively impacted the lives of many. He was known to not tolerate discrimination and he sought justice and fairness where it was due.

In 1967, when Smith was the President of the London Club, he took a stand against the discrimination of Jewish people who would not be admitted to the private club. Smith partnered up with a Jewish lawyer, who put his name up for membership and fought relentlessly until the club would admit its first Jewish member. After a long fight with lots of resistance, Smith succeeded. Immediately after, Jewish members were welcome in every private club in London.

Smith was an official supporter of Fanshawe College and Boys and Girls Club of London as well as many other charities and individuals.

In 1974, Smith began his long-term partnership with the Boys and Girls Club of London. EllisDon expanded its clubrooms in addition to building a new gym and swimming pool. He was also involved in other renovation and construction projects for the organization including the Don Smith Young Wing in 1995 and an Aquaplex in 2006. Although he came from a construction background, Smith's involvement was mainly attributed to his fundraising efforts.

In 2008, along with his daughter, Lynne Cram, Smith organized the Horizons Campaign to raise funds for the M.A.P. Program (My Action Plan for Education) that supports youth from Grade 4 to post-secondary school to achieve their academic goals.

Politics 
Smith also had a passion for politics. He was involved in the Ontario Liberal Party, and was elected party president Feb. 17, 1985, when he served as chief fundraiser for Premier David Peterson’s government. After 42 consecutive years under conservative rule, Smith helped rebuild the Ontario Liberal Party and bring it back to prominence.

Death 
On July 16, 2013, at 89 years old, Smith died in London, Ontario as a result of an illness. A celebration of his life was held in his memory on July 23 at the London Hunt Club, and was attended by family, friends, and employees.

Awards 
As a result of his feat against the discrimination of Jewish people in private London clubs in the late 1960s, Smith was awarded a Lifetime Achievement Award by the Canadian Council of Christians and Jews.

In May 2014, Smith was inducted, posthumously, into the Canadian Business Hall of Fame as part of its 36th Class of Companion Inductees. This award recognizes Canadian business leaders for their financial success as well as contributions to Canadian business and society.

References

1924 births
Canadian business executives
2013 deaths